The  is an archaeological site with the traces of a late Japanese Paleolithic settlement located in the former town of Kawaguchi in what is now part of the city of Nagaoka, Niigata in the Hokuriku region of Japan. It was found to contain one of the largest number of stone tools of any site thus far discovered in Japan. It was designated a National Historic Site of Japan in 2004.

Overview
The Araya site is located on a river terrace near the confluence of the Shinano River and the Uono River, approximately one kilometer south of Echigo-Kawaguchi Station. Four excavations have been conducted thus far, starting in 1957. Excavated materials are stored in Meiji University (1st survey), Tōhoku University (2nd and 3rd surveys), the Nagaoka City Board of Education (4th survey), and at Tokyo National Museum. The site extends over an area 100 meters from east-to-west by 50 meters north-to south, and contains the ruins of several villages from approximately 17,000 years ago. The ruins overlap, indicating that a semi-nomadic population repeatedly returned to this site over many centuries. The foundations of pit dwellings and storage pits have been found.

Excavated artifacts included 6000 microlith blades, 9000 microlith cores made by the Yubetsu technique, 1,000 lithic cores by the Horoka technique, and chisel-shaped stone tools, a large number of scrapers, and over 100,000 arrow and spear points. The base materials were mostly hard shale, which is common in along the Sea of Japan coastal areas. It was estimated that the bone, horn and leather products were also actively produced at the site, to make completed projectile points, and as such material were also needed as part of the secondary processing to produce very thin sharpened blades. During the Upper Paleolithic period, roughly until 13,000 years ago, the shapes and types of stone tools, such as stone axes, spears, and microlith blades evolved due to rapid changes in the environment, which resulted in changes in the fauna available for hunting. Microliths, thin and razor-shape blades of stone which were used by embedding into shafts of wood or bone, appears towards the end of the Upper Paleolithic.

The combination of a chisel-shaped stone tools designated the "Araya-type" and wedge-shaped microlithic blade cores has become an important index in the study of Paleolithic culture in Northeast Asia, and the style of tools found display both Mesolithic and Neolithic traits, similar to what has been found widely distributed across Siberia from Lake Baikal and into Alaska.

The site is located about 10 minutes by car from Echigo-Kawaguchi Station on the JR East Jōetsu Line.

See also
List of Historic Sites of Japan (Niigata)

References

External links
Nagaoka City home page 
Japanese Paleolithic Society 

Paleolithic sites in Japan
History of Niigata Prefecture
Nagaoka, Niigata
Historic Sites of Japan